{{Infobox song
| name       = Celebration～君に架ける橋～
| cover      = Kyuhyun_Celebration_～_Kimini Kakeru_Hashi_～_cd.jpg
| alt        =
| caption    = CD Only cover
| type       = single
| artist     = Kyuhyun
| album      =
| A-side     = ''"Celebration ～Kimini Kakeru Hashi～| B-side     = 
| released   = May 25, 2016
| recorded   = 2016
| studio     =
| venue      =
| genre      = J-pop
| length     =
| label      = Avex Trax
| writer     = 
| producer   =
| prev_title =
| prev_year  =
| next_title =
| next_year  =
| misc       = 
}}Celebration ～Kimini Kakeru Hashi～''' is a debut Japanese single recorded by Super Junior's Kyuhyun. The single was released on May 25, 2016 by Avex Trax.

Background and release
On April 21, it was announced that Kyuhyun will be released debut single in Japan named "Celebration ～Kimini Kakeru Hashi～", which was scheduled to be released in Japan on May 25, 2016. On May 11, further information regarding the single would be distributed under three formats: CD+Smapler, CD+DVD+Smapler and CD+DVD E.L.F Japan Edition. The accompanying music video for the single features Rina Kawaei, an actress and former member of AKB48, who acted as Kyuhyun's love interest. The single debuted at number 1 on the Japanese Oricon Singles Chart, selling 27,690 physical copies in its first day of release.

Track listing

Charts and sales

Chart

Sales

Release history

References

2016 songs
Japanese-language songs
Cho Kyuhyun songs